Nam Wan is a bay south of Sai Tso Wan, Tsing Yi Island, Hong Kong. It is at one end of Nam Wan Tunnel.

"Nam Wan" means South Bay in Cantonese.

Tsing Yi
Bays of Hong Kong